The Vatnsmýrin Nature Reserve ("water marsh") is a protected moorland in Reykjavík, Iceland.
The reserve provides a water source for Tjörnin Lake and is a nesting ground for birds.
It borders the Nordic House and the University of Iceland. The area within the Reserve including drains and fences, and measures . Eighty-three species of vascular plants are documented. Biodiversity has been inhibited due to invasive animals and plants as well as industrial waste.

History
Parts of what is now Vatnsmýri had been used as agricultural fields since the 19th century. In the 20th century, building activity encroached into the area. As the area had been known for its importance for wetland nesting birds, Vatnsmýri was designated a Nature Conservation area in 1981. The lake and parts of the wetland were established as a nature reserve in 1984 by the Reykjavík City Council. A general conservation plan, particularly for activities related to the nesting area of birds, was developed for the period of 1990–2001 by the City Council. A master plan for the period 2001–2024 was subsequently developed with detailing for pond areas, fencing, walkways, and bridges. In 2012, the Nordic House promoted an exhibit on Vatnsmýrin.

Vegetation
A floral survey was carried out in 2003 which identified species of vascular plants in the reserve. Swamp vegetation is the common flora. This is characterized as wetland vegetation, vegetation on an old excavation area, as well as vegetation on embankments. A report of 83 species vascular plants, itemized 65 as original Icelandic flora. Varied soil conditions in the reserve are attributed to the large floral diversity. The vascular plant species identified are the following:

 Achillea millefolium
 Achillea ptarmica
 Aconitum x stoerkiana Reichenb
 Agrostis capillaris
 Agrostis stolonifera
 Alchemilla alpina
 Alchemilla glomerulans Buser
 Alchemilla tela
 Alopecurus pratensis
 Angelica archangelica
 Anthoxanthum odoratum
 Anthriscus sylvestris Hoff
 Betula pubescens Ehrh
 Bromus inermis leysse
 Calamagrostis Strict Koele
 Caltha palustris
 Card Mine pratensis
 Carex lyngbyei Horne
 Carex nigra Reichardt
 Cerastium
 Chamomilla suaveolens Rydb
 Cirsium arvense scop
 Dactylis Glomerata
 Deschampsia caespitosa Beauv
 Elymus repens Gould
 Epilobium palustre
 Epilobium Watsonia Barbey
 Equisetum arvense
 Equisetum palustre
 Eriophorum angustifolium
 Euphrasia Frigida Pugsley
 Festuca rubra
 Festuca vivi pair Sm
 Filipendula ulmaria Maxim
 Galium verum
 Hippuris vulgaris
 Juncus alpinoarticulatus Chaix
 Juncus articus Wild
 Juncus articulates
 Leontodon autumnalis
 Leymus arenarius Hochst
 Luzula multi flora Lej
 Matricaria maritima
 Menyanthes trifoliate
 Montia fontana
 Myosotis arvensis
 Parnassia palustris
 Phalaris arundinacea
 Phleum pretense
 Pinguicula vulgaris
 Plantago maritima
 Poa annuals
 Poa pratensis
 Potentilla anserine
 Potentilla palustris scop
 Ranunculus acris
 Ranunculus repens
 Rhinanthus minor
 Rumex acetosa
 Rumex acetosella
 Rumex longifolius
 Saws procumbens
 Salix alaxensis
 Salix caprea
 Salix lanata
 Salix myrsinifolia
 Salix phylicifolia
 Senecio vulgaris
 Sorbus aucuparia
 Stellaria graminea
 Stellaria media
 Taraxacum officinale
 Trifolium medium
 Trifolium repens
 Triglochin palustris
 Tussilago farfara
 Valeriana sambucifolia
 Vicia cracca
 Vicia sepium
 Viola palustris

Conservation
As a result of deterioration noted in the wetlands of Vatnsmýrin Reserve in recent years, the number of birds reported in the lake demonstrates a declining trend. This is attributed to the lack of adequate nesting grounds, though as a reserve, the nesting area has lacked adequate protection for nearly a decade as result of invasive plant species and animals. Chervil and thistle, which have grown dense, preclude birds from nesting. Action plans have been initiated jointly by the Nordic House, the University of Iceland, and City Council to improve the conditions in the reserve by removing invasive species, replacing these with wetland vegetation, building embankments, building sedimentation ponds in the main stream to improve the flow through the moors, and de-silting the lake.

References

External links
 Official website (Icelandic language)

Geography of Reykjavík
Protected areas of Iceland
Tourist attractions in Reykjavík